The Anyuak, also known as Anyua and Anywaa, are a Luo Nilotic ethnic group inhabiting parts of East Africa. The Anuak belong to the larger Luo family group. Their language is referred to as Dha-Anywaa. They are primarily found in Gambela Region in western Ethiopia, South Sudan as well as Sudan. Group members number between 200,000 and 300,000 people worldwide. Many of the Anyuak people now follow Christianity. It is one of the first of the Nilotic groups to become almost entirely Christian, following the Shilluk people.

History 
According to American non-profit organization Cultural Survival, the Anuak originally lived on land near the Pibor River and the Sobat River, in present-day eastern South Sudan near Ethiopia. Due to displacement from other groups, most Anuak now live along the Baro River and the Akobo River.  

The Anuak are a Nilotic people. They have lived in the area of the Upper Nile for hundreds of years and consider their land to be their tribal land.  
Unlike other Nilotic peoples in the Upper Nile, whose economies are based on raising cattle, the Anuak are herdsmen and farmers. They are believed to have a common origin with their northern neighbors, the Luo and Shilluk. Also, they share a similar language with their neighbors to the south, the Acholi.The Luo peoples are scattered all over Eastern Africa, including Sudan and Ethiopia; they identify as a people who have preserved their cultural heritage wherever they reside. The Luo-speaking people of Eastern Africa are found beyond the Sudan and Ethiopia in Uganda, Kenya, Tanzania and the Congo. Their language(s) and dialects belong to the broader cluster of Nilo-Saharan languages.

During the Abyssnian Empire, many Anuak people were taken as slaves, often by wealthy and imperial households. Slavery in predominantly Anuak regions was abolished in the early 20th century, but was briefly restored following World War II.

According to Human Rights Watch, a prominent non-governmental organization, the Anuak people were the predominant ethnic group in Ethiopia's western Gambela Region, until the 1980s. However, beginning in 1984, the Derg regime embarked on a resettlement program, whereby 60,000 people from the central Ethiopian Highlands were relocated to Anuak lands in the Gambela Region. Simultaneously, the Second Sudanese Civil War broke out to the west of the Gambela Region, resulting in a large amount of refugees fleeing into the same area. These changes were further compounded by a gradual migration of the Nuer people eastward into the region, which had been taking place throughout the 20th century.

Following the collapse of the self-proclaimed socialist People's Democratic Republic of Ethiopia in 1991, ethnic tensions and episodes of ethnic violence broke out in the Gambela Region. Many Anuak openly resented the migration of non-Anuak residents into their historic lands, and perceived their ethnic territory to be shrinking. From 1991 onwards to the mid-2000s, ethnic clashes which have killed hundreds and displaced thousands have taken place between the Anuak and other peoples in the Gambela Region.

During the 2000s, the Ethiopian military began conducting operations to neutralized armed Anuak groups in the region. These groups, which are not unified under any single organization or political cause, include groups which target other ethnic groups and Ethiopian soldiers. The Ethiopian government has taken an increased interest in providing stability in the Gambela Region due to the recent discovery of petroleum and gold in the area.

As a result of inter-ethnic violence, and alleged discrimination from the Ethiopian government, a sizeable Anuak diaspora began to form during the 1990s and 2000s. Many settled in Minnesota, in the United States.

Geographic distribution 

The Anuak people predominantly reside in western Ethiopia and South Sudan. Many live along the Baro River and the Akobo River, and within the Gambela Region of Ethiopia. The Anuak of Sudan live in a grassy region that is flat and virtually treeless. During the rainy season, this area floods, so that much of it becomes swampland with various channels of deep water running through it.

Diaspora 
Following the collapse of the People's Democratic Republic of Ethiopia in 1991, large-scale inter-ethnic violence broke out between the Anuak people and other ethnic groups in Ethiopia. Anuak people in Ethiopia faced inter-ethnic violence and alleged persecution from the government throughout the 1990s and 2000s, resulting in large-scale displacements of Anuak people. As a result, many Anuak people emigrated to the United States, specifically, Minnesota. Some received relocation assistance from the International Organization for Migration. Many Anuak people which have migrated to Minnesota are employed in the meatpacking industry, working for companies such as Hormel Foods and Smithfield Foods.

Economy 
The Anuak people of Ethiopia and Sudan largely reside in a subsistence economy, with rivers serving an important role. The Anuak people are largely agricultural, and animal husbandry is common. Sorghum is a common crop for the Anuak, and common livestock include cattle, sheep, and goats. They grow their crops among the riverbanks which in turn provides them a stable and efficient supply of food. When the dry season occurs, the Anuak people hunt the animals that are in search of the waterways. Many Anuak also partake in fishing, especially outside of the dry season, and will set up temporary villages in good fishing areas. Many also hunt wild birds as part of their diet.

The Anuaks also choose when to migrate their cattle based on which season is occurring (migrate in dry the dry season). The migration of domesticated animals is not as important to them as it is to other cultures because the Anuak people do not have as much livestock as most as they focus more on agriculture. The Anuaks engage in agriculture, hunting, fishing, pastoralism and gathering to meet their economic needs.

Culture and religion 
The Anuak predominantly live in tight-knit communities which are largely self-contained, and often have little communication with the outside world. The Gambela Region, where many Anuak people within Ethiopia live is low-lying, and is hot and tropical with rich, fertile, well-watered soil coming from the rivers. Much is carried down from the mountains of the highlands, which has a cooler, drier climate. This is in stark contrast to much of Ethiopia, which is geographically dominated by the Ethiopian Highlands. Following the resettlement program implemented by the Ethiopian government in the 1980s, many people from the Ethiopian Highlands were resettled into predominantly Anuak areas. These migrants, which include Tigrayans, Oromo, Kambaata, Amhara peoples, are collectively referred to as "highlanders" by many Anuak people. Inter-ethnic violence between the Anuak and these so-called "highlanders" was commonplace during the 1990s and the 2000s. The mostly insular social structure of the Anuak, combined with historical and modern inter-ethnic conflicts, have led to outside observers, such as Cultural Survival, to describe them as "very suspicious of outsiders".

Anuak villages are run by people called Headmen, whose power can easily be removed if deemed unsatisfactory by the people. Anuak philosophy dictates there are no "God-men", and Headmen can be removed for behaving in a way perceived as dictatorial.

Nowadays, many Anuak people are evangelical Christians. Traditional Anuak religion placed a particular emphasis on trees, with some villages having "holy" trees. Tradional Anuak religion placed a belief in an almighty spirit known as Gwok.

Human rights issues
Anuak activists have claimed that ethnic Anuaks in Ethiopia have suffered from torture, indiscriminate killings, looting, and discrimination from various other minority militias operating in the country, as well as from the Ethiopian government itself. During the 2000s, when such violence escalated, a report by Genocide Watch and Survivors' Rights International collected testimonies of Anuak people, which painted a picture of widespread raping and killing of Anuak civilians, as well as the destruction of their property by the Ethiopian government and allied militias. The groups' 32-page report accused the Ethiopian government and allied militias of perpetuating genocide. In 2004, Gregory Stanton, the President of Genocide Watch, compared the situation to "Rwanda in 1993, when all the early warning signs were evident but no one paid attention", and put the violence on their emergency list of ongoing genocides in the world. A 2007 report by The International Human Rights Law Clinic at the Washington College of Law submitted to the United Nations Committee on the Elimination of All Forms of Racial Discrimination concluded that the Ethiopian government's response to violent massacres in 2003 was in violation of the International Convention on the Elimination of All Forms of Racial Discrimination. A 2005 report by Human Rights Watch also found that the Ethiopian militia "has committed widespread murder, rape and torture" against Anuak cilivians. The report amounted the actions of the Ethiopian military to crimes against humanity. The former governor of the Gambela Region, Okello Akuaye, has also accused the government of aiding local militias in attacking Anuak civilians. According to Anuak militants, Anuak men (and some women) continue to be subject to arbitrary arrest, beatings, detentions and extrajudicial killings in Ethiopia.

Human rights issues faced by the Anuak and others who live in the lowlands of the Gambela Region has affected the Anuaks' access to water, food, education, health care, and other basic services, as well as limiting opportunities for development of the area.

The Ethiopian government has denied that its military was involved in attacks on Anuaks, and instead attributed violence in the region to local ethnic militias. Others have alleged that Anuak militias have committed human rights abuses against other groups, such as killing Nuer civilians. A 2006 article by BBC News characterized local violence as a dispute between the Anuak and the Nuer "over access to pasture, water and fertile land in the Gambella region".

When the Derg regime enacted a mobilization of all Ethiopian males in March 1983, many Anuak opposed conscription on a cultural basis. The government carried out an systemic enforcement of this conscription, which resulted many young service-age Anuak to flee to Sudan or remote regions within Ethiopia to avoid conscription.

Diaspora response 
In response to an escalation in violence in western Ethiopia during the 2000s, a group of Anuaks living in the United States and Canada formed the Anuak Justice Council, an organization to promote the human rights of Anuaks. The group has collaborated with other non-governmental organizations to document instances of violence, and to lobby various countries to condemn the practices of the Ethiopian government.

References

External links
 Anuak Media
 Anuak Justice Council
 The case study of Anuak-Nuer Conflict in Gambella Region of Ethiopia Prepared By Abebe Eticha
 Ethiopia army 'killed and raped'
 ANUAK GENOCIDE 
 OLAC resources in and about the Anuak language
 Gambella Today
 Ethiopia's policy of genocide against the Anuak of Gambella
 African Christianity under Attack: the Anuak Genocide
 The Anuak Legacy

Further reading 
 Evans-Pritchard, E. E. 1940. The Political System of the Anuak of the Anglo-Egyptian Sudan. New York: AMS Press.
 Feyissa, Dereje. 2011. Playing Different Games: The Paradox of Anywaa and Nuer Identification Strategies in the Gambella Region, Ethiopia. New York, Oxford: Berghahn Books.
 Osterlund, David C. 2021. The Anuak Legacy: Music & Culture. Saint Paul, MN: The University of Northwestern Berntsen Library.
 Perner, Conradin 1994-2016. The Anyuak: Living on Earth in the Sky. An analytic account of the history and culture of a Nilotic people. In 8 volumes. Basel: Helbing & Lichtenhahn Verlag and Schwabe-Verlag. (Vol. I – The Sphere of Spirituality , Vol. II – The Human Territory , Vol. III – The Human Being , Vol. IV – A personal Life , Vol. V – The Anyuak Village – Centre of Civilisation (on Social Structures and Justice) , Vol. VI – The Political Body: Power and Authority , Vol. VII – Spheres of Action, Anyuak Art , Vol. VIII – Anyuak Histories. With a Bibliography ).
 Perner, Conradin 1992. Anyuak Religion. Leeds: Journal of Religion in Africa, Vol. II.
 Perner, Conradin 1990. Anyuak – A Luo Language of the Southern Sudan: Dictionary and short Grammar. Yale: Human Relations Area Files Inc.

Nilotic peoples
Ethnic groups in East Africa
Ethnic groups in South Sudan
Ethnic groups in Ethiopia
Ethnic groups in Sudan